The Annals of Physical and Rehabilitation Medicine is a bimonthly peer-reviewed medical journal covering physical medicine and rehabilitation. It is published by Elsevier on behalf of the French Society of Rehabilitation (Société française de médecine physique et de réadaptation). It was established in 1982 as Annales de Réadaptation et de Médecine Physique, obtaining its current name in 2009.

Abstracting and indexing
The journal is abstracted and indexed in Index Medicus/MEDLINE/PubMed.

References

External links

Physical medicine and rehabilitation journals
English-language journals
Bimonthly journals
Elsevier academic journals
Publications established in 1982